Ch'iyar Jaqhi (Aymara ch'iyara black, jaqhi precipice, cliff,  "black cliff", also spelled Chiar Jakke) is a mountain in the Andes of Bolivia, about  high. It lies in the Oruro Department, Sajama Province, in the north of the Turco Municipality. Ch'iyar Jaqhi is situated north-west of the mountains Yaritani and Wankarani.

References 

Mountains of Oruro Department